Reginald George Wilkinson (26 March 1899 – 14 September 1946) was an English professional footballer who played as a wing half for Sunderland.

References

1899 births
1946 deaths
Footballers from Norwich
English footballers
Association football wing halves
Norwich City F.C. players
Sunderland A.F.C. players
Brighton & Hove Albion F.C. players
English Football League players